The following is a list of regional ornithological societies.

Africa
South Africa
 BirdLife South Africa

Asia
India
 Bombay Natural History Society (BNHS): Located at Mumbai (formerly Bombay).
 Sálim Ali Centre for Ornithology and Natural History (SACON) Located near Coimbatore.

Japan
 Wild Bird Society of Japan (WBSJ)
 Yamashina Institute for Ornithology

South Korea
 Birds Korea

Caribbean
 BirdsCaribbean

Dominican Republic
 Hispaniolan Ornithological Society

Europe

Danmark
 Dansk Ornitologisk Forening

Germany
 Deutsche Ornithologen-Gesellschaft

Italy
 LIPU, Lega Italiana Protezione Uccelli

Norway
 Norwegian Ornithological Society

Poland
 Polish Society for the Protection of Birds (OTOP)

Spain
 Spanish Ornithological Society 
 Catalan Ornithological Institute

Sweden
Sveriges ornitologiska förening (SOF)

Switzerland
 Swiss Ornithological Institute (Vogelwarte)

United Kingdom
 British Ornithologists' Club
 British Ornithologists' Union (BOU)
 British Trust for Ornithology (BTO)
 British Birds Rarities Committee
 Royal Society for the Protection of Birds (RSPB)
 Scottish Ornithologists' Club
 Wildfowl and Wetlands Trust (WWT)

North America
Canada
 Bird Studies Canada
 Society of Canadian Ornithologists 
British Columbia Field Ornithologists

Mexico
 CIPAMEX, La Sección Mexicana del Consejo Internacional para la Preservación de las Aves, A.C.

USA
 American Birding Association
 American Ornithological Society (Formed in 2016 by the merger of the American Ornithologists' Union and the Cooper Ornithological Society)
 Association of Field Ornithologists
 Baird Ornithological Club
 Cornell Laboratory of Ornithology
 National Audubon Society
 Ornithological Council 
 Pacific Seabird Group 
 Raptor Research Foundation 
Rocky Mountain Raptor Program 
 Waterbird Society 
 Wilson Ornithological Society

Oceania
Australia
 Birds Australia

New Zealand
 Ornithological Society of New Zealand
 Royal Forest and Bird Protection Society of New Zealand

References

Ornithological organizations
Ornith